Charles Bock (born 1969) is an American writer whose debut 2008 novel Beautiful Children (published by Random House) was selected by The New York Times as a Notable Book of the Year for 2008, and won the 2009 Sue Kaufman Prize for First Fiction from the American Academy of Arts and Letters. He currently lives in Brooklyn, New York.

Biography
Bock was born and raised in Las Vegas, which served as the setting for Beautiful Children. He comes from a family of pawnbrokers who've operated pawn shops in Downtown Las Vegas for more than thirty years. On his website, he reflects upon his upbringing as a source of inspiration for the novel:
 

Bock earned a Master's of Fine Arts in fiction and literature from Bennington College and has taught fiction at the Gotham Writers Workshop in New York City.

Bock is a 2009 recipient of the Silver Pen Award (Nevada Writers Hall of Fame), which was established in 1996 to recognize mid-career writers who have already shown substantial achievement.

Personal life 
In 2009, Bock's first wife, Diana Colbert, was diagnosed with leukemia. The couple's daughter, Lily Starr, was six months old at the time. Following a pair of bone marrow transplants, Diana Colbert died in December 2011, three days before Lily Starr's third birthday. He subsequently married writer Leslie Jamison, with whom he has a daughter. They are no longer married, and share custody of their daughter.

Beautiful Children
Bock's first novel Beautiful Children is about the interwoven lives of several characters in Las Vegas. The story focuses on the issue of homeless teenage runaways. Young Newell has A.D.D. and his overbearing mother Lorraine is not too keen on him hanging out with his older friend Kenny. The Girl With the Shaved Head is looking to fit in with some questionable characters that she just met on the Las Vegas Strip. Pony Boy has not always been the best boyfriend and lover to his stripper girlfriend Cheri. Comic book writer Bing Beiderbixxe is just in Vegas for the weekend. These characters' lives intersect in this unflinching tale about lost innocence.

Alice & Oliver 
Bock's second novel, Alice & Oliver, is based on his late wife Diana Joy Colbert and her illness. The novel follows a character battling cancer.

References

External links
 What Happened in Vegas Stayed in His Novel - The New York Times Sunday Magazine, January 27, 2008
 "Beautiful Children" Book Review, Cover, The New York Times Book Review
 "Depravity's Rainbow" - The New Republic
 Beautiful Children Book Review - Entertainment Weekly
 Fear and Loathing in Las Vegas: A young runaway descends into the hellacious lost world of modern America - Washington Post
 Interview with Bock published in Las Vegas Weekly, November 1, 2007
 [http://www.esquire.com/features/esquire-100/122words1007 Esquire'''s List of 100 hot things for 2008, mentions Beautiful Children]
 Review of Beautiful Children from Publishers Weekly
 BeautifulChildren.net Official website for Beautiful Children 
 Radio Interview with Charles Bock on "Read First, Ask Later" (Ep. 24)''
Rake's Progress, Harper's Magazine, 3/2013  
For Love or Money, Harper's Magazine, 6/2011 
Joint Ventures, Harper's Magazine, September 2015

1969 births
21st-century American novelists
Bennington College alumni
Living people
People from the Las Vegas Valley
Novelists from New York (state)
American male novelists
21st-century American male writers